On 7 January 2022, an explosion caused by a gas leak in a canteen building in Wulong District, Chongqing, southwest China, killed at least 16 people and injured 10 others.

See also
 2009 Chongqing mine blast

References

2022 disasters in China
Explosions in 2022
Explosions in China
Explosion
January 2022 events in China